Eccleshall is a civil parish in the Borough of Stafford, Staffordshire, England. It contains 110 listed buildings that are recorded in the National Heritage List for England. Of these, three are listed at Grade I, the highest of the three grades, five are at Grade II*, the middle grade, and the others are at Grade II, the lowest grade.  The parish includes the town of Eccleshall, villages including Croxton, and the surrounding area.  In the parish are Eccleshall Castle, at one time the home of the Bishops of Lichfield, and the remains of an earlier castle around the site of the house, Holy Trinity Church, which contains the tombs of four bishops, other churches and associated structures, and timber framed houses and other buildings, including Broughton Hall.  Most of the other listed buildings are houses and associated structures, cottages, shops, farmhouses and farm buildings, and the rest include public houses and a hotel, the remains of a windmill, a milestone, a holy well, a former police station, a former fire station, a drinking fountain, a war memorial, and a telephone kiosk.


Key

Buildings

References

Citations

Sources

Lists of listed buildings in Staffordshire
Listed